The heats for the men's 200 metre breaststroke race at the 2009 World Championships took place in the morning and evening of 30 July, with the final in the evening session of 31 July at the Foro Italico in Rome, Italy.

Records
Prior to this competition, the existing world and competition records were as follows:

The following records were established during the competition:

Results

Heats

Semifinals

Final

External links 
Heats Results
Semifinals Results
Final Results

Breaststroke Men 200